Aluva is a station of Kochi Metro. The station is located besides the Aluva flyover near Aluva Market.

The station is situated near the banks of the Periyar river. It was inaugurated by the Prime Minister of India Narendra Modi on 17 June and opened for public on 19 June 2017 as a part of the first stretch of the metro system, between Aluva and Palarivattom. 

Aluva Metro station is a submission to the Periyar river. Along with the pictures of the rivers, the structure of the station is designed to indicate the river water flame.

Location and connections

Aluva metro station is located on the side of the Aluva flyover along the National Highway at Aluva Bypass Junction. 

Aluva private bus stand is located right next to the metro station and provides services to Perumbavoor, Angamaly, Mala, Paravoor, Kochi Airport, Kalady, etc. Additionally, buses stop at the entrance of the metro station to accommodate passengers. 

Aluva railway station and Aluva KSRTC bus station are situated 2 km away from the metro station. Passengers can reach the railway station by bus or autorickshaws. Long distance KSRTC buses which skip the KSRTC stand have their Aluva stop in front of the metro station.

References

Kochi Metro stations
Railway stations in India opened in 2017
Buildings and structures in Ernakulam district